Gran Premio della Liberazione is an Italian road bicycle race that has been held annually on 25 April since 1946. It marks the anniversary of the 1945 fall of Benito Mussolini's Italian Social Republic. It is a Single-day race that is rated 1.2 on the UCI Europe Tour.

Winners

Men's race

Women's race
In 2016, the Gran Premio della Liberazione Pink was held for the first time, after a previous GP Liberazione race was held between 1989 and 2012.

References

External links
 
 

Recurring sporting events established in 1946
1946 establishments in Italy
Cycle races in Italy
UCI Europe Tour races